A Proguibourtinidin is a type of condensed tannins formed from guibourtinidol (leucoguibourtinidin). They yield guibourtinidin when depolymerized under oxidative conditions.

They can be found in Guibourtia coleosperma (the African rosewood) or in Cassia abbreviata.

References 

Condensed tannins